Basil Crews (15 March 1925 – 14 April 2005) was a South African cricketer. He played in sixteen first-class matches from 1945/46 to 1958/59.

References

External links
 

1925 births
2005 deaths
South African cricketers
Border cricketers
Eastern Province cricketers
Gauteng cricketers
Western Province cricketers
People from Robertson, Western Cape
Cricketers from the Western Cape